Le Grand-Bornand is a commune in the eastern French department of Haute-Savoie. The commune is a ski resort and takes its name from the river that runs through it. The inhabitants of Le Grand-Bornand are called Bornandins.

Geography
Located on the western slope of the Aravis mountain range not far from Mont Blanc, Annecy Lake and  Switzerland, Le Grand-Bornand is a summer and winter resort which developed around an old village. Le Grand-Bornand is in a wide part of the valley which has allowed it to develop – the village of Petit-Bornand, located downstream, is in a narrower part of the valley. The commune of Le Grand-Bornand is made-up of three areas: the Bouchet valley, the Chinaillon valley and the village of Le Grand-Bornand located at the junction of the two valleys. The hamlet of Chinaillon to the north east of Le Grand-Bornand is the main ski centre. The valley of Bouchet is located upstream of the village along the course of the river Borne.

Nearby
Nearby villages include Manigod, Thônes, La Clusaz, Saint-Jean-de-Sixt and the larger Chamonix and Annecy.

History

 1569: Church fire
 1715: Opening of a school
 1755: End of the dispute with neighbouring village La Clusaz on the delimitation between the territories of the two villages
 11 March 1817: Violent earthquake causes property damage
 28 October 1923: Creation of a ski club, the "société des skieurs bornandins".
 24 August 1944: 76 troops from the Vichy government's militia, condemned to death on 23 August by a court martial of the French Forces of the Interior and after a parody of a trial, are publicly shot close to the Peseretaz wood. 44 were buried in a cemetery created on the spot in the Bouchet valley.
 14 July 1987: A brutal and unforeseeable flood of the Borne river, following a violent storm over the mountain, submerges the valley and devastates in particular the campsite of Le Grand-Bornand. There 21 fatalities and two missing persons. The commune and the State were forced to compensate the families of the victims as the campsite had been located on the river floodplain.
 11 April 2003: property developer, Xavier Flactif, and his family are killed in their country cottage in Chinaillon by a neighbour, David Hotyat.
 22 July 2004: The village is the finish for a stage of the 2004 Tour de France. He was later stripped of this and many other wins for doping.
 22 February 2006: Roddy Darragon wins a silver medal in a ski sprint at the 2006 Winter Olympics in Turin and the following day, Sylvie Becaert takes the bronze medal in the biathlon.

Twinning
Since 1997, Le Grand Bornand is twinned with Quiberon.

Place names
Researcher toponymist and Ph.D. graduate of the Sorbonne, Jérémie Delorme, has listed, photographed and described, about 3 000 place names in the commune. 90% come from Latin, 8% come from Gaulish, 1% from Germanic and 1% from pre-Latin languages. A third of the names refer to former occupants. Names ending in "ière" are pre 16th-century and names ending in "lhon" are pre 5th-century.

Administration

List of mayors
Jean Bastard Rosset – March 1971 to March 1977
Pierre Pochat Cottilloux – March 1983 to March 1989
Andre Perrillat Amédé – March 1989 to March 2008
Gérard Perrissin-Fabert – March 2008 to present

Presidential election 2007
Le Grand-Bornand voting in the 2nd round of the 2007 French presidential election
Nicolas Sarkozy: 84% Royal Ségolène: 17%

Places and monuments
 Church of the Virgin Mary of the Assumption: it has been confirmed this church dates from 1346. It was partially destroyed by a fire in 1569 and the bell-tower completely rebuilt in 1661. It was  completely rebuilt in 1877.  The bell-tower, finished in 1845, is remarkable for its Baroque outer shell.
 Chinaillon chapel
 Bouchet chapel
 Nant-Robert chapel
 Gramusset refuge
 Maroly virtual lake
 Militiamen cemetery

People
 Roddy Darragon: silver medalist in cross-country skiing individual sprint event in the 2006 Winter Olympics
 Sylvie Becaert: bronze medalist in the biathlon at the 2006 Winter Olympics and 2005 world champion
 Christophe Perrillat: French cross-country skiing team member at the 2006 Winter Olympics
 Steve Missillier: member of the 2007 French Alpine skiing team
 Sebastien Baker-Bidoz: former member of the French Alpine skiing team
 Tessa Worley: member of the French Alpine skiing team. 2013 and 2017 world champion in the alpine skiing giant slalom event.

Economy
 Tourism: ski resort. Le Grand-Bornand holds the award "Station verte de vacances" (Green holiday resort).
 Winter sports: The station is highly rated for beginner skiers and family holidays. However, although there are a few good restaurants, there is minimal nightlife. 
 Agriculture: Le Grand-Bornand is one of the birthplaces of reblochon, a cheese produced from abondancière, tarine and montbéliarde cows raised on Crau hay.
 Companies:
 Aravis Boissons has manufactured Forclaz lemonade since 1870 according to the same, original recipe (water + sugar + bubbles)

Facilities
 Village hall
 Social housing
 Swimming pool
 Mini golf
 Golf
 Tennis
 Trampoline

Outdoor activities
 Biathlon
 Skiing
 Snowboarding
 Cross-country skiing
 Hiking
 Mountain-biking
 Excursions
 Dodes forest
 Mushroom collecting
 Via Ferrata

Events
 "To happiness of the kids", children's festival
 "To each their turn" (June 2007) Publicity in schools by the organisers of the Tour de France, to develop the image of "the outer loop" for future generations of consumers.
 July 15–16, 2007: Arrival of 7th stage of the Tour de France 2007 (Bourg-en-Bresse – Le Grand-Bornand) and departure of 8th stage of the Tour de France 2007, 165 kilometres between Le Grand-Bornand and Tignes.
 Alps Mountain festival (at the beginning of August)
 Ball of the conscripts, organized in May each year
 Week of the mountain, discovering local fauna and flora. One evening is organized by the mountain security and the Office of mountain Guides. In 2007 it is from 21 to 27 July.

Tour de France
Le Grand-Bornand has been the start town for three stages of the Tour de France, in 1995, 1999 and 2007. It was the finish of a stage in 2004, 2007, 2009 and 2013. Stage 8 of the 2021 Tour de France finished here.

Finishes

Departures

References

External links

Le Grand-Bornand Chinaillon accommodation provider
Le Grand-Bornand official website
ViaFerrata.org Le Grand Bornand Via Ferrata: Tour de Jalouvre 

Communes of Haute-Savoie
Ski resorts in France